The Norman Medal is the highest honor granted by the American Society of Civil Engineers for a technical paper that "makes a definitive contribution to engineering science". The medal was instituted by ASCE in 1872 and originally endowed by George H. Norman, M.ASCE. In 1897, ASCE assumed responsibility for the Norman Medal.

This list contains recipients of the Norman Medal since 1874 (the first year it was awarded).

Recipients

 1874: J. James R. Croes (1834-1906)
 1875: Theodore G. Ellis
 1877: William W. Maclay; Book Prize To Julius H. Striedonger
 1879: Edward P. North; Book Prize To Max E. Schmidt
 1890: Theodore Cooper
 1881: L. L. Buck
 1882: A. Fteley And F. P. Stearns
 1883: William P. Shinn
 1884: James Christie
 1885: Eliot C. Clarke
 1886: Edward Bates Dorsey
 1887: Desmond Fitzgerald
 1888: E. E. Russel Tratman
 1889: Theodore Cooper
 1890: John R. Freeman
 1891: John R. Freeman
 1892: William Starling
 1893: Desmond Fitzgerald
 1894: Alfred E. Hunt
 1895: William Ham Hall
 1896: John E. Greiner
 1897: Julius Baier
 1898: B. F. Thomas
 1899: E. Herbert Stone
 1900: James A. Seddon
 1902: Gardner S. Williams; Clarence W. Hubbell; And George H. Fenkell
 1904: Emile Low
 1905: C. C. Schneider
 1906: John S. Sewell
 1907: Leonard M. Cox
 1908: C. C. Schneider
 1909: J. A. L. Waddell
 1910: C. E. Grunsky
 1911: George E. Gibbs
 1912: Wilson Sherman Kinnear
 1913: J. V. Davies
 1914: Caleb Mills Saville
 1915: Allen Hazen, J. A. L. Waddell
 1916: J. A. L. Waddell
 1917: Benjamin F. Groat
 1918: L. R. Jorgensen, J. A. L. Waddell 
 1919: William Barclay Parsons
 1920: J. A. L. Waddell
 1922: Charles H. Paul
 1923: D. B. Steinman
 1924: B. F. Jakobsen
 1925: Harrison P. Eddy
 1926: Julian Hinds
 1927: B. F. Jakobsen
 1928: Charles E. Sudler
 1929: Gilbert T. Rude
 1930: Karl von Terzaghi
 1931: Floyd A. Nagler And Albion Davis
 1933: Hardy Cross
 1934: Leon Solomon Moisseiff
 1935: D. C. Henny
 1936: Daniel W. Mead
 1937: J. C. Stevens
 1938: Hunter Rouse
 1939: Charles H. Lee
 1940: Shortridge Hardesty And Harold E. Wessman
 1941: J. A. Van Den Broek
 1942: Karl Terzaghi
 1943: Thomas E. Stanton
 1944: Ralph B. Peck
 1945: Merrill Bernard
 1946: Karl Terzaghi
 1947: Boris A. Bakhmeteff And William Allan
 1948: Alfred M. Freudenthal
 1949: Gerard H. Matthes
 1950: Friedrich Bleich
 1951: D. B. Steinman
 1953: Friedrich Bleich And L. W. Teller
 1954: Robert H. Sherlock
 1955: Karl Terzaghi
 1956: Carl E. Kindsvater And Rolland W. Carter
 1957: Alfred W. Freudenthal
 1958: Anestis S. Veletsos And Nathan M. Newmark
 1959: Willard J. Turnbull And Charles R. Foster
 1960: Carl E. Kindsvater And Rolland W. Carter
 1961: Lorenz G. Straub And Alvin G. Anderson
 1962: William Mcguire And Gordon P. Fisher
 1963: Bruno Thurlimann
 1964: T. William Lambe
 1965: Gerald A. Leonards And Jagdish Narain
 1966: Charles H. Lawrence
 1967: Daniel Dicker
 1968: H. Bolton Seed And Kenneth L. Lee
 1969: Basil W. Wilson
 1970: Cyril J. Galvin, Jr.
 1971: John H. Schmertmann
 1972: Nicholas C. Costes; W. David Carrier, III; James K. Mitchell; And Ronald F. Scott
 1973: Bobby O. Hardin And Vincent P. Drnevich
 1974: James R. Coffer
 1975: Roy E. Olson; David E. Daniel, Jr.; And Thomas K. Liu
 1976: Charles C. Ladd And Roger Foott
 1977: H. Bolton Seed; Kenneth L. Lee; Izzat M. Idriss; And Faiz I. Makdisi
 1978: Richard D. Barksdale
 1979: Anil K. Chopra
 1980: John L. Cleasby And James C. Lorence
 1982: Abdulaziz I. Mana And G. Wayne Clough
 1983: Theodore V. Galambos, Bruce R. Ellingwood, James G. Macgregor, And C. Allin Cornell
 1984: Sudipta S. Bandyopadhyay
 1985: James L. Sherard; Lorn P. Dunnigan; And James R. Talbot
 1986: James L. Sherard
 1987: Egor P. Popov; Stephen A. Mahin; And Ray W. Clough
 1988: Gholamreza Mesri And Alfonso Castro
 1989: Abdul-Hamid Zureick And Robert A. Eubanks
 1990: Anestis S. Veletsos And Anumolu M. Prasad
 1991: Ernesto F. Cruz And Anil K. Chopra
 1992: Scott D. Schiff; William J. Hall; And Douglas A. Foutch
 1993: Ronie Navon And Abraham Warszawski
 1994: Ronald D. Ziemian; William Mcguire; And Gregory G. Deierlein
 1995: Mauricio Ehrlich and James K. Mitchell
 1996: James R. Martin II and G. Wayne Clough
 1997: William F. Marcuson III; Paul F. Hadala; and Richard H. Ledbetter
 1998: Bruce R. Ellingwood and David Rosowsky
 1999: Lawrence A. Bergman; Thomas K. Caughey; Anastasios G. Chassiakos;  Richard O. Claus; George W. Housner; Sami F. Masri; Robert E. Skelton; Tsu T. Soong; B. F. Spencer; and James T. P. Yao
 2000: Roberto T. Leon; Jerome F. Hajjar; Carol K. Shield; and Michael A.Gustafson
 2001: Anil K. Chopra and Rakesh K. Goel
 2002: Sherif El-Tawil and Gregory G. Deierlein
 2003: C. Allin Cornell; Douglas A. Foutch; Ronald O. Hamburger; and Fatemeh Jalayer
 2004: Gholamreza Mesri, Ph.D. and Marawan M. Shahien, Ph.D.
 2005: Kok-Kwang Phoon, M.Asce; Fred Kulhawy, Ph.D., P.E., G.E., Hon.M.Asce; Mircea D. Grigoriu, Ph.D., F.Asce
 2006: Ramachandran Kulasingam, Ph.D., A.M.ASCE,; Erik J. Malvick, Ph.D.,A.M.ASCE; Ross W. Boulanger, Ph.D., P.E., M.ASCE; and Bruce L. Kutter, Ph.D., M.ASCE
 2007: Ning Lu, Ph.D., M.ASCE and William J. Likos, Ph.D., M.ASCE
 2008: Amit Kanvinde, Ph.D., A.M.ASCE and Gregory G. Deierlein, P.E., F.ASCE
 2009: Steven L. Kramer, Ph.D., P.E., M.ASCE and Roy T. Mayfield, P.E., M.ASCE
 2010: Tommaso Moramarco, M.ASCE; Claudia Pandolfo; and Vijay P. Singh, Ph.D, D.SC., D.WRE, F.ASCE
 2011: Shadi S. Najjar, D.Eng., A.M.ASCE and Robert B. Gilbert, P.E., D.GE., M.ASCE
 2012: Mark Mahan, Ph.D., P.E., M.ASCE, Yannis F. Dafalias, Ph.D., M.ASCE, Mahdi Taiebat, Ph.D., P.Eng., M.ASCE, YeongAe Heo, Ph.D., and Sashi K. Kunnath, Ph.D. F.ASCE
 2013: Anil K. Chopra, Ph.D., M.ASCE
 2014: William J. Likos, Ph.D., M.ASCE and ASCE Rani Jaafar
 2015: Jose D. Salas, Ph.D., M.ASCE and Jayantha Obeysekera, Ph.D., P.E., D.WRE, M.ASCE
 2016: Brett W. Maurer, Ph.D., M.ASCE, Russell A. Green, Ph.D., P.E., M.ASCE, Misko Cubrinovski, Ph.D., and Brendon A. Bradley, Ph.D.
 2017: Steven L. Kramer, Ph.D., P.E., M.ASCE and C.H. Wang, Ph.D., PMP
 2018: Kara D. Peterman, EIT, A.M.ASCE; Matthew J.J. Stehman; Robert L. Madsen, P.E., M.ASCE; Stephen G. Buonopane, P.E., M.ASCE; Narutoshi Nakata, Ph.D., M.ASCE; and Benjamin W. Schafer, Ph.D., P.E., M.ASCE
 2019: Jordan Aaron, Ph.D.; Oldrich Hungr, Ph.D.; Timothy Stark, Ph.D., P.E., D.GE, F.ASCE and Ahmed Baghdady, Ph.D., A.M.ASCE
 2020: Chong Tang and Kok-Kwang Phoon, Ph.D., P.E., F.ASCE
 2021: Ning Lu, Ph.D., F.EMI, F.ASCE; Chao Zhang, Ph.D., A.M.ASCE
 2022: Farshid Vahedifard, Ph.D., P.E., F.ASCE; Firas Jasim; Fred Tracy; Masood Abdollah, S.M.ASCE; Aneseh Alborzi; Amir AghaKouchak, Ph.D., P.E., M.ASCE

See also

 List of engineering awards

References

Awards of the American Society of Civil Engineers